Bite Club is an Australian crime thriller television series which aired on the Nine Network from 15 August to 3 October 2018. The show centres around a group of shark attack survivors, named the "Bite Club", who are being targeted by a serial killer. It stars Todd Lasance and Ash Ricardo as Detectives Dan Cooper and Zoe Rawlings, along with Dominic Monaghan as Senior Constable Stephen Langley.

Production
On 4 October 2017, the series was announced, with Dominic Monaghan set to star in a lead role. On 11 October, the series was officially confirmed at Nine's upfronts set to air in 2018. The eight-part series began airing on 15 August 2018.

The show centres around a group of shark attack survivors, named the "Bite Club", who are being targeted by a serial killer. Todd Lasance and Ash Ricardo play Detectives Dan Cooper and Zoe Rawlings, who are trying to catch the killer. Monaghan plays Senior Constable Stephen Langley. The rest of the cast includes, Damian Walshe-Howling as psychologist Kristof Olsen, Deborah Mailman as Superintendent Anna Morton, Robert Mammone as Detective Sergeant Jim Russo, Marny Kennedy as semi-pro surfer Amber Wells, Darcie Irwin-Simpson as Detective Claire Hobson, Arka Das as Forensic Specialist Depak Chaudhary, and Pia Miller as Zoe's best friend Kate Summers. Actress Jessica Falkholt will make a posthumous appearance, following her death on 17 January 2018.

Bite Club is written by Sarah Smith and John Ridley, and directed by Peter Andrikidis, Geoff Bennett, Wayne Blair and Jennifer Leacey.

Bite Club began filming on-location in the suburb of Manly in September 2017. Filming took place at Dee Why, Curl Curl Beach and The Steyne pub. The Manly Pavilion became the outside of a police station, while the interior rooms were built at North Head. Other locations considered for the show's setting included Bondi and Maroubra. Filming for the series ended on 7 December 2017.

Cast
 Todd Lasance as Detective Constable Dan Cooper
 Ash Ricardo as Detective Senior Constable Zoe Rawlings
 Dominic Monaghan as Senior Constable Stephen Langley
 Deborah Mailman as Superintendent Anna Morton
 Damian Walshe-Howling as Kristof Olsen
 Robert Mammone as Detective Sergeant Jim Russo
 Pia Miller as Kate Summers 
 Marny Kennedy as Amber Wells
 Darcie Irwin-Simpson as Detective Claire Hobson
 Arka Das as Depak Chaudhary
 Jessica Falkholt as Emma Bailey

Episodes

Reception

Critical Reception
David Knox of TV Tonight gave the opening episode two and a half stars out of five. He wrote, "Melodrama is part of the problem of this drama which needs to commit to one of the two genres it straddles. For a crime about a serial killer the travelogue shots and warm hues is pretty confusing." Knox disliked Leacey's "sluggish" direction, and felt that the episode was lacking in energy. He added that the first episode needed to be stronger, with "a bit more teeth to take hold."

Ratings

Home media 

The complete series of Bite Club is available on 9now and Stan in Australia.

References

External links
 

Nine Network original programming
2010s Australian drama television series
2010s Australian crime television series
2018 Australian television series debuts
Television series by Playmaker Media
2018 Australian television series endings